Office sharing is a concept that allows companies who own or manage an office, that have redundant office space to share or rent the workstations or self-contained units to smaller companies looking for flexible workspace. This creates revenue for the company that runs the office, and provides a cheap, flexible alternative for companies looking for an office outside of their home. The main benefit of sharing an office is that it provides a more dynamic environment for both companies involved and access to new markets.

However, sharing office space does come with some problems of its own:
 Higher office management costs (cleaning services, printer ink, office supplies and so on)
 Faster wear and tear of office equipment
 Potential NDA issues if the space isn't properly divided
 Setup costs (dividing the space with fake walls)
 Management Software costs (resource management, reception desk software, meeting room management and so on)
The arrangement can be particularly sensitive in the case of attorneys and MDs - in such cases, a legally-binding Office Sharing Agreement should be carefully considered and redacted.

Office Sharing is similar to Coworking, though coworking spaces tend to include more tenants, a broader range of amenities and a stronger emphasis on community and networking.

See also
 Sublease
 Shared services
 Coworking spaces

References

External links
 Kathleen Landis, Yours, Mine, Ours, My Business magazine, OctNov 2002 at National Federation of Independent Business

Business terms